The packaging and labeling of food is subject to regulation in most regions/jurisdictions, both to prevent false advertising and to promote food safety.

Regulations by type

Multi-faceted
 Codex Alimentarius (international voluntary standard)

Ingredients and basic nutrition

 Calorie count laws (restaurants)
 Ingredients list
 Nutrition facts label
 [Name & address of manufacturer]
 [Date:]

Nutritional rating systems 

 Nutri-Score
 Traffic light rating system
 Health Star Rating System

Veracity

 False advertising
 Health claims

Food-handling materials

 Food safe symbol

Specific foods 
 Olive oil regulation and adulteration
 Food grading labels
 Instructions for Use
 Exp: Date

Vegan 
 "Certified Vegan" by Vegan Awareness Foundation trademark for vegan companies and organizations
 "PETA-Approved Vegan" by PETA for vegan products (clothing and accessory companies), United States, available worldwide
 "Sunflower symbol" by the Vegan Society, United Kingdom trademark for vegan food, available worldwide
 "V-Label" by the European Vegetarian Union, Swiss trademark for vegan items (specified by product), available worldwide
"Biocyclic Vegan" by BNS Biocyclic Network Services Ltd., Cyprus, for vegan organic production (e.g. vegetable production without manure)

Vegetarian 
 "The green dot symbol" (Vegetarian mark), Indian requirement for food, available worldwide
 "V-Label" by the European Vegetarian Union, Swiss trademark for vegan and vegetarian items (specified by product), available worldwide
 "Vegetarian Society Approved" by the Vegetarian Society, United Kingdom, available worldwide

Farming practices 
 Free range
 Grass fed beef
 Organic certification
 Sustainable agriculture
 UTZ Certified

Religious certifications 
 Halal (Islamic dietary laws)
 Kashrut (Kosher foods in Jewish law)

Controversies 
 Ag-gag

Named geographic origin 
 Appellation
 Geographical indication
 Country of origin
 Protected Geographical Status (European Union)
 Appellation d'origine contrôlée (France)
 Denominazione di Origine Controllata (Italy)

Genetic and commercial origin 

 Labeling of genetically modified food
 Produce traceability
 Standards of identity for food

Preparation at site of consumption 
 Shake well

Pricing 
 Pay what you want (PWYW)
 Pay what you can (PWYC)
 Dine and dash
 Maximum retail price (MRP)

Safety information 
 Alcohol abuse
 Danger zone (food safety)
 Five-second rule
 Food allergy
 Food intolerance
 Food safety
 Food sampling
 Food spoilage
 International Food Safety Network
 ISO 22000
 Refrigerate after opening
 Shelf life dates ("Use by" and "Best before")
 Warning label
 Food Allergen Declaration FALCPA

By region 
 FAO GM Foods Platform
 Food Administration

Asia

India 
 Food Safety and Standards Authority of India

Thailand 
 Phuket: "Yellow flag" for vegetarian food during ‘ngan kin jeh’ vegetarian festival

North America

Canada 
 Food and Drugs Act
 Monsanto Canada Inc v Schmeiser

Mexico 
 NOM-051-SCFI/SSA1-2010

United States 
 Acceptable Market Name
 Adulteration of Coffee Act 1718
 American Agricultural Law Association
 Dietary exposure assessments in the United States
 Dietary Supplement Health and Education Act of 1994
 Early history of food regulation in the United States
 Fair Packaging and Labeling Act (US)
 FDA Food Safety Modernization Act
 Federal Food, Drug, and Cosmetic Act
 Federal Meat Inspection Act
 Food and Drug Administration Amendments Act of 2007
 Food and Drug Administration Modernization Act of 1997
 Food libel laws
 Food Quality Protection Act
 Generally recognized as safe
 Global Food Security Act of 2009 
 Kevin's Law
 Mandatory country-of-origin labeling of food sold in the United States
 Personal Responsibility in Food Consumption Act
 Public Law 114-214, regulating GMO food labeling
 Pure Food and Drug Act
 Regulation of food and dietary supplements by the U.S. Food and Drug Administration
 Standards of identity for food
 Title 21 of the Code of Federal Regulations
 United States v. Correll
 United States v. Ninety-Five Barrels Alleged Apple Cider Vinegar

Europe

European Union
Regulation (EC) No. 834/2007 of 28 June 2007 on organic production and labelling of organic products
 Regulation (EU) No 1169/2011
Regulation 1151/2012 on quality schemes for agricultural products and foodstuffs: defines "labelling" as "any words, particulars, trade marks, brand name, pictorial matter or symbol relating to a foodstuff and placed on any packaging, document, notice, label, ring or collar accompanying or referring to such foodstuff".

United Kingdom 
 Assize of Bread and Ale
 McLibel case
 United Kingdom food labeling regulations
 The Weights and Measures (Packaged Goods) Regulations 2006

Oceania 
 Food Standards Australia New Zealand

New Zealand 
 Food Act 1981

South America

Chile 
 Food Labelling and Advertising Law

See also 
 Food and drink prohibitions
 Food safety
 Food security

References

Appellations
Brand management
Food law
Food packaging
Food labelling
Product certification
Product management
Regulation
Retailing-related lists
Religious dietary certification organizations
Religious consumer symbols